Alessia Nobilio (born 7 September 2001) is an Italian amateur golfer. She won silver at the 2018 Summer Youth Olympics.

Amateur career
Nobilio had a successful amateur career across Europe. She won the 2016 and 2017 International Juniors of Belgium, the Italian U18 Team Championship in 2015, 2017 and 2019, the Italian Ladies Stroke Play Championship in 2019 and 2020, and the 2020 Portuguese Ladies Amateur.

Also, she was runner-up at the Italian Ladies Amateur twice (2016 and 2019), at the 2016 Austrian Ladies Amateur, and lost the final of the Spanish Ladies Amateur twice, in 2017 to Frida Kinhult of Sweden and in 2019 to Candice Mahe of France. In 2018 she was runner-up at the German Girls Open, one stroke behind Ingrid Lindblad, and in 2019 runner-up at the Internazionali d'Italia Femminili U18. She placed 5th at the 2019 Girls Amateur Championship after finishing as the leading qualifier for the match play stage.

At the World Junior Girls Championship in Canada, she won the team gold in 2018 and lost a playoff to Seo-yun Kwon in 2017 for the individual title, was runner-up two strokes behind Atthaya Thitikul in 2018, and was third in 2019, again behind winner Thitikul.

Nobilio won the girls' individual silver at the 2018 Summer Youth Olympics after prevailing in a playoff against Emma Spitz of Austria and Yuka Saso of the Philippines.

She represented Italy at the European Girls' Team Championship or the European Ladies' Team Championship each year between 2015 and 2021, winning in 2016 and 2018. Ranked as one of the best juniors in Europe, she represented the continent in the Junior Solheim Cup and Junior Ryder Cup, as well as the Junior Vagliano Trophy and the Vagliano Trophy.

Nobilio reached the number three spot in the World Amateur Golf Ranking and in 2020 accepted a golf scholarship to UCLA where she is an business economics major. However, due to pandemic restrictions she wasn't able to start her freshman year in person at UCLA and missed out on her first year on the UCLA Bruins women's golf team.

She played in the 2020 U.S. Women's Open and the 2021 Ladies Italian Open, where she finished tied 21st. She was top female in the 2021 Roma Alps LETAS Open, a mixed event staged jointly by the 2021 Alps Tour and the 2021 LET Access Series.

Amateur wins
2015 (2) Italian U18 Team Championship (Emilio Pallavacino Trophy) (with Karla Camila Vigliotta), Targa d'Oro 
2016 (3) International Juniors of Belgium, Targa d'Oro, French Ladies Amateur
2017 (2) International Juniors of Belgium, Italian U18 Team Championship (Emilio Pallavacino Trophy) (with Caterina Don)
2019 (4) Italian Ladies Stroke Play Championship (Isa Goldschmid Trophy), Italian U18 Team Championship (Emilio Pallavacino Trophy), Citta di Milano Trofeo Gianni Albertini, Trofeo Glauco Lolli Ghetti
2020 (4) Italian Ladies Stroke Play Championship, Gran Premio Vecchio Monastero, Gran Premio di Monticello, Portuguese Ladies Amateur
2021 (1) Gran Premio Vecchio Monastero Memorial Antonio Bozzi
2022 (1) English Women's Open Amateur Stroke Play Championship

Source:

Professional wins

LET Access Series

^ Low female golfer

Team appearances
Amateur
European Girls' Team Championship (representing Italy): 2015, 2016 (winners), 2017, 2018 (winners)
European Ladies' Team Championship (representing Italy): 2019, 2020, 2021, 2022
Junior Golf World Cup: (representing Italy): 2016
World Junior Girls Championship (representing Italy): 2017, 2018 (winners), 2019
Junior Vagliano Trophy: (representing the Continent of Europe): 2017 (winners)
Junior Solheim Cup (representing Europe): 2017, 2019
Junior Ryder Cup (representing Europe): 2018
Vagliano Trophy: (representing the Continent of Europe): 2019 (winners)
Summer Youth Olympics (representing Italy): 2018
Espirito Santo Trophy (representing Italy): 2018

Source:

References

External links

Alessia Nobilio on the World Amateur Golf Ranking official site
Alessia Nobilio on the UCLA Bruins official site

Italian female golfers
UCLA Bruins women's golfers
Golfers at the 2018 Summer Youth Olympics
Sportspeople from Milan
2001 births
Living people